Ironi Tiberias is a football club from Tiberias, Israel. The club is not connected to Hapoel Tiberias, a former club which spent several seasons in the top division of Israeli football in the 1960s and the 1980s, making its last appearance in the top flight in 1989.

History
Football was played in Tiberias before the Israeli Declaration of Independence, the first club in the city, Maccabi Tiberias, was formed in 1925 and was playing football as early as 1927. A year later, Maccabi Tiberias competed in the first ever edition of the Israel State Cup.

The best known club from Tiberias was Hapoel Tiberias, which played in the top division of the Israeli football in the 1960s, from 1961–62 to 1964–65, and later again in 1988–89.

A third club operating in Tiberias during these years was Beitar Tiberias, although it mainly played in the lower levels of the Israeli league, its best performance being reaching Liga Bet, the third tier in the late 1960s and the 1970s.

By the late 1990s both Maccabi and Hapoel has folded, and the only active club was Beitar Tiberias. In 2001 the club was merged with Hapoel Mo'atza Ezorit Galil Tahton to form Hapoel Galil Tahton/Tiberias. in 2007 the club changed its name to Ironi Tiberias.

In 2006–07 the club finished 2nd in Liga Bet North B and was promoted through play-offs. After several season in Liga Alef North, the club qualified to the promotion play-off at the end of the 2010–11 season, falling in first round to Hapoel Asi Gilboa. The following season the club finished 2nd in Liga Alef, but didn't take part in the promotion play-offs, which involved only the league winner, Hapoel Asi Gilboa.

The club finished 2nd once again in 2013–14 and qualified to the promotion play-offs, and after beating Maccabi Daliyat al-Karmel, Hapoel Migdal HaEmek and Hapoel Azor, faced Hapoel Katamon Jerusalem in the decisive promotion/relegation play-offs. Tiberias won 5–1 on aggregate (3–0, 2–1), and promoted to Liga Leumit. However, the club's spell in Liga Leumit lasted only one season, as they finished second bottom in the 2014–15 season and relegated back to Liga Alef.

Current squad
As of 29 June 2022

Honours

League

1As Beitar Tiberias

References

Tiberias
Association football clubs established in 2006
Tiberias
2006 establishments in Israel
Sport in Tiberias